Mohit Ahlawat is an Indian actor known for his roles in Shagird (2011), Shiva (2006) and James (2005).

Personal life 
Ahlawat was born in the city of Panipat in Haryana state. He married model Sai Purandare Johar in 2005, but got separated in 2011. Mohit & Sai have a daughter together. His father exports furniture and has factories both in India and China.

Filmography

External links

References

Male actors in Hindi cinema
21st-century Indian male actors
Living people
Year of birth missing (living people)